Norman Harvey VC (6 April 1899 –16 February 1942) was an English recipient of the Victoria Cross, the highest and most prestigious award for gallantry in the face of the enemy that can be awarded to British and Commonwealth forces. He re-enlisted in World War II and was killed in action.

Early life
Harvey was born on 6 April 1899 to Charles William and Mary Harvey.  He married Nora Osmond.

World War I
Harvey was 19 years old, and a Private in the 1st Battalion, The Royal Inniskilling Fusiliers, British Army during the First World War when on 25 October 1918 at Ingoyghem, Belgium, he performed a deed for which he was awarded the Victoria Cross:

Citation

World War II
Harvey enlisted into the Royal Engineers in 1939 and joined 199 Railway Workshop Company. He was promoted to Company Quartermaster-Sergeant in April 1941. He was killed in action, near Haifa, Mandatory Palestine (now Israel) on 16 February 1942.

Victoria Cross
Harvey's Victoria Cross is displayed at the Regimental Museum of The Royal Inniskilling Fusiliers in Enniskillen Castle, Enniskillen, Northern Ireland.

References

Monuments to Courage (David Harvey, 1999)
The Register of the Victoria Cross (This England, 1997)
The Sapper VCs (Gerald Napier, 1998)
VCs of the First World War - The Final Days 1918 (Gerald Gliddon, 2000)

1899 births
1942 deaths
Military personnel from Lancashire
British World War I recipients of the Victoria Cross
Royal Inniskilling Fusiliers soldiers
Royal Engineers soldiers
British Army personnel of World War I
British Army personnel killed in World War II
People from Newton-le-Willows
British Army recipients of the Victoria Cross